Beehive Mountain is a mountain 5 nautical miles (9 km) north of Finger Mountain, standing at the north margin and near the head of Taylor Glacier, in Victoria Land, Antarctica. It was named by the Discovery Expedition (1901–04), possibly at the suggestion of Albert Armitage who discovered it.
Climbed by the three members of the New Zealand Advance Party on 21 January 1956.

Further reading
PETER REJCEK, Blood Falls Becomes First Subglacial ASPA To Protect Scientific Values, ANTARCTIC SUN, August 31, 2012

References

Mountains of Victoria Land